The 1971 Tulane Green Wave football team was an American football team that represented Tulane University during the 1971 NCAA University Division football season as an independent. In their first year under head coach Bennie Ellender, the team compiled a 3–8 record.

Schedule

References

Tulane
Tulane Green Wave football seasons
Tulane Green Wave football